Tokia Afféda Saïfi (born 11 July 1959 in Hautmont, Nord) is a French politician who served as Member of the European Parliament for the North-West of France from 1999 until 2019. She is a member of the Radical party and of the Union for a Popular Movement, part of the European People's Party. She is a former member of Ecology Generation.

Political career
Saïfi was first elected as Member of the European Parliament in the 1999 elections. During her first term in parliament, she first served on the Committee on Employment and Social Affairs. Following the 2004 elections, she joined the Committee on International Trade; from 2014 until 2019, she served as the committee's vice-chairwoman under the leadership of Bernd Lange. In this capacity, she was the parliament's rapporteur on trade and investment-driven growth for developing countries as well as on human rights and social and environmental standards in international trade agreements.

In addition to her committee assignments, Saïfi was the vice-chairwoman of the parliament's delegation for relations with the Maghreb countries and the Arab Maghreb Union and a member of the delegation to the Parliamentary Assembly of the Mediterranean. In this capacity, she took part in the EU's observer mission for the 2012 legislative elections in Algeria.

Political positions
In the Republicans’ 2016 presidential primaries, Saïfi endorsed Alain Juppé as the party's candidate for the office of President of France.

References 

 "Tokia SAÏFI" European Parliament biography.

1959 births
Living people
People from Nord (French department)
French people of Algerian descent
Ecology Generation politicians
Liberal Democracy (France) politicians
Radical Party (France) politicians
MEPs for North-West France 2004–2009
MEPs for North-West France 2009–2014
MEPs for North-West France 2014–2019
Union for a Popular Movement MEPs
Radical Party (France) MEPs
21st-century women MEPs for France
The Republicans (France) MEPs
French Ministers of the Environment
Women government ministers of France
Agir (France) MEPs